Today is a 1930 American pre-Code drama film directed by William Nigh and starring Conrad Nagel, Catherine Dale Owen and Sarah Padden. It was co written by Seton I. Miller and was based on a play by George Howells Broadhurst, which had previously been made into a silent film of the same title. The film's sets were designed by the art director Albert S. D'Agostino.

Plot
After her husband loses a fortune in the Wall Street Crash and is forced to work as a used car salesman, a young wife is unable to bear the loss in status.

Cast
 Conrad Nagel as Fred Warner  
 Catherine Dale Owen as Eve Warner  
 Sarah Padden as Emma Warner  
 John M. Sullivan as Henry Warner  
 Judith Vosselli as Marian Garland  
 Julia Swayne Gordon as Mrs. Farrington  
 William Bailey as Gregory  
 Edna Marion as Gloria Vernon  
 Robert Thornby as Telka  
 Drew Demorest as Pierre

References

Bibliography
 Pitts, Michael R. Poverty Row Studios, 1929–1940: An Illustrated History of 55 Independent Film Companies, with a Filmography for Each. McFarland & Company, 2005.

External links

1930 films
American drama films
Majestic Pictures films
Films directed by William Nigh
1930 drama films
American black-and-white films
1930s English-language films
1930s American films